The Atlantic tripletail or tripletail (Lobotes surinamensis) is a warm-water marine fish found across the tropics; it can grow to 90 cm long and weigh 18 kg. It is also known by fishermen by names like flasher or steamboat. Young fishes float on their sides, often beside flotsam, and appear like a dry leaf.

Geographical distribution 
The Atlantic tripletail is the only fish in the family Lobotidae that can be found in the Atlantic Ocean. It is, however, distributed across tropical seas especially in the Indonesian region which is commonly found in wet markets such as in Pontianak, West Kalimantan.

In US waters, Atlantic tripletails are found from Massachusetts and Bermuda to Argentina, the eastern Atlantic and Mediterranean Sea, from Madeira Island to the Gulf of Guinea, the eastern Pacific from Costa Rica to Peru, and the western Pacific from Japan to Fiji and Tuvalu. They are rarely found north of Chesapeake Bay. They are found on the Gulf Coast from April to October and then migrate to warmer waters during winter. In the spring, tripletails concentrate just offshore of two particular spots: Port Canaveral, Florida (March–June) and Jekyll Island, Georgia (April–July).

Habitat 
Atlantic tripletails are found coastally in most, but not all, tropical and subtropical seas. They are semimigratorial and pelagic. Normally solitary, they have been known to form schools. They can be found in bays, sounds, and estuaries during the summer. Juveniles are usually found swimming under patches of Sargassum algae. In the Gulf of Mexico, adults are usually found in open water, but can also be found in passes, inlets, and bays near river mouths. Large adults are sometimes found near the surface over deep, open water, although always associated with floating objects. Young fishes are also often found in or near shipwrecks, beams or supports, jetties, flotsam and sea buoys. Fry are usually found in waters that exceed 84 °F (29 °C), greater than 3.3‰ salinity, and more than 230 feet (70 m) deep.

Tripletails are well known for their unusual behavior of floating just beneath the surface with one side exposed, mimicking a leaf or floating debris. This is thought to be a feeding strategy because of the locality of their prey items and the floating structures associated with this behavior. The behavior has resulted in a rapidly increasing incidence of recreational fishermen sight-fishing for the floating tripletails, resulting in severe bag and length restrictions in Florida and Georgia to ensure future populations.

Biology

Distinctive features 
The Atlantic tripletail has scales that extend onto its dorsal, anal, and caudal fins and a head profile that concaves as the fish ages. It has a compressed but deep body with a triangle-shaped head. The eyes are small, but the mouth is large. The bases of the dorsal and anal fins are scaled and the pectoral fins are shorter than the pelvic fins. The name "tripletail" is given because of the fish's three rounded fins: dorsal, caudal, and anal.

Coloration 
Juvenile Atlantic tripletails are colored a mottled yellow, brown, and black. Adults are jet black. When it lies on its side at the surface, the tripletail is sometimes confused for a floating mangrove leaf. The juveniles have white pectoral fins and a white margin on their caudal fins. Adult tripletails have varied mottled color patterns which range from dark brown to reddish brown, often with a tint of gray.

Size, age, and growth 
The Atlantic tripletail has a distinctive appearance and can be easily recognized by its three dorsal fins of equal size, which are positioned along its back. The body is generally dark brown or greenish, with irregular lighter spots or blotches. The species has a compressed body shape and can reach up to 1 meter in length and weigh up to 27 kg. The Atlantic tripletail has a broad head with a large mouth, and its eyes are positioned on the top of the head. The species has a relatively short lifespan, with a maximum reported age of 8 years.

Diet 
Atlantic tripletails are opportunistic eaters; they feed on a variety of foods, mostly small finfish such as gulf menhaden, Atlantic bumpers, and anchovies. They also feed on invertebrates such as blue crabs and brown shrimp, as well as other benthic crustaceans.

Reproduction 
Spawning primarily occurs in the summer along both the Atlantic and the U.S. Gulf of Mexico coasts, with peaks during July and August.  The species is known to spawn in open water, with peak spawning occurring in the summer months. Females can produce up to 700,000 eggs per spawning event, and the eggs are pelagic and buoyant. The larvae are planktonic and undergo significant morphological changes before settling to the substrate. Males reach sexual maturity at a smaller size and younger age than females. Large congregations of tripletails during the summer months in the inshore and nearshore waters of coastal Georgia suggest this area is a critical estuarian spawning habitat for the species. Larval Atlantic tripletails go through four levels of development; preflexion, flexion, postflexion, and transformation. By the time the larvae reach 0.16 in (4 mm), they have large eyes and concave heads. The larval forms of Atlantic tripletails resemble those of boarfishes, some jacks, spadefishes, and bass.

Predators 
Atlantic tripletail does not have many predators but is preyed upon by a variety of larger predators, including sharks, barracudas, and other large predatory fish. Juvenile tripletail are also vulnerable to predation by birds, such as pelicans and gulls, which can be attracted to floating debris where the fish are sheltering.

Parasites 
Parasites of the tripletail include the copepods Anuretes heckelii which affects the branchial cavities, Lernanthropus pupa which affects the gill filaments, and Scianophilus tenius.

Importance to humans 
A few tons of Atlantic tripletails are fished commercially on the east and west coasts of Florida, and marketed fresh, frozen, or salted. They are mainly caught using haul seines, gill nets, and line gear. They are common in driftnet catches of tuna along the edge of the continental shelf. This fish is targeted by recreational anglers for its delicious meat.

Conservation 
The Atlantic tripletail is not listed as endangered or vulnerable with the World Conservation Union (IUCN).  Both Florida and Georgia have a bag limit of two fish per day for recreational fishing.  In Florida, the minimum length is 18 in; in Georgia, 18 in.

References

External links 
 
 
 
 https://drive.google.com/file/d/0B7Lv0YXXOpf8ZTVWUWQ4STFNRGs/view?usp=docslist_api

Fish of the Atlantic Ocean
Lobotidae
Fish of the Red Sea
Fish described in 1790